Andrzej Abramowicz (died 1763) was a Polish-Lithuanian nobleman. He was Castellan Lithuanian Brest (1757-1763) and Knight of the Order of the White Eagle (1761).

References

1763 deaths
18th-century Polish nobility
Year of birth unknown